The Perkins Addition was a 13-house development in Salt Lake City, Utah.  Ten of its houses survived in 1983 and nine were each individually listed on the National Register of Historic Places.

History
The Perkins Addition was a "streetcar subdivision" development of 13 brick houses, all built in 1891 by a Denver investment company, ten of which survived in 1983 and nine of which were listed on the National Register.

The nine NRHP-listed ones are each covered in a section below.  The one not NRHP-listed is the Elgin S. Yankee House, at 955 E. 1700 South.

John Vaughan
John Vaughan was an architect who designed many homes.

W.S. Burhaus
W.S. Burhaus was a contractor who built many of them.

Alexander Mitchell House

The Alexander Mitchell House at 1620 S. 1000 East, in Salt Lake City, Utah, was built in 1891.  It was listed on the National Register of Historic Places in 1983 for its architecture, which is Victorian Eclectic, Late Victorian, and other.

The Mitchell House is one of three buildings in the NRHP listing of Perkins Addition houses that are not built from the pattern-book design shared by seven others.  It includes similar elements:  a prominent gable in its front facade, and the use of fishscale shingles in gabled areas.

Byron Cummings House

The Byron Cummings House at 936 E. 1700 South, in Salt Lake City, Utah, was built in 1891.  It was listed on the National Register of Historic Places in 1983.

It is significant in part for association with Byron Cummings, known as "the father
of athletics" at University of Utah.

It is one of seven identical-plan buildings in the Perkins Addition, built from the same pattern-book design.  The Perkins Addition was a "streetcar subdivision" development of 13 brick houses, all built in 1891 by a Denver investment company, ten of which survived in 1983.

Harper J. Dininny House
925 E. Logan Avenue, NRHP-listed

Charles H. Weeks House
935 E. Logan Avenue, NRHP-listed

Thomas Yardley House
955 E. Logan Avenue, NRHP-listed

John W. Judd House
918 E. Logan Avenue, NRHP-listed

Clifford R. Pearsall House
950 E. Logan Avenue, NRHP-listed

Henry Luce House
921 E. 1700 South, NRHP-listed

Mabry-Van Pelt House
946 E. 1700 South, NRHP-listed

References

External links

Historic districts in Utah
Houses completed in 1891
Houses in Salt Lake City
Residential buildings on the National Register of Historic Places in Utah
Victorian architecture in Utah
National Register of Historic Places in Salt Lake City